Roland of Parma, also called Rolando Capelluti, was an early 13th-century surgeon. He studied under Roger Frugardi in Parma and wrote a commentary on his teacher's Practica chirurgiae (Practice of Surgery) around 1230. His commentary, known as the Rolandina, became the standard surgical textbook in the West for the next three centuries. He later taught in Bologna.

Notes

References

Bibliography

Physicians from Parma
13th-century Italian writers
Medieval surgeons